This is a list of the 22 regions of Madagascar (since 2009) by Human Development Index as of 2021.

See also 

 List of countries by Human Development Index

References 

Human Development Index
Madagascar
Madagascar